Ken Wagner (born c. 1957) is a former American football coach.  He was the head football coach at Carthage College in Kenosha, Wisconsin, serving for two seasons, from 1983 to 1984 and compiling a record of 6–12.

Head coaching record

College

References

Year of birth missing (living people)
1950s births
Living people
Carthage Firebirds football coaches
High school football coaches in Wisconsin